The Cuvette Centrale (French: "Central Basin") is a region of forests and wetlands in the Democratic Republic of the Congo. Some definitions consider the region to extend into the Republic of the Congo as well. The Cuvette Centrale lies in the center of the Congo Basin, and is bounded on the west, north, and east by the arc of the Congo River.

Description
A lake covered the region during the Pliocene epoch, which was gradually filled with sediments, and the surface of the basin is very flat. Slow-moving tributaries of the Congo, including the Lopori, Maringa, Ikelemba, Tshuapa, Lomela, and Lokoro, drain westwards.

The region lies on the Equator, and the climate is tropical and humid. Rainfall averages 2,000 mm annually.

The Eastern Congolian swamp forests extend along the Congo River and its chief tributaries, and cover wide areas in the western portion of the Cuvette Centrale. These swamp forests are seasonally or permanently flooded. The Central Congolian lowland forests extend across the remaining portion of the region. The swamp forests are home to endangered species of megafauna, including lowland gorillas and forest elephants.

Climate change

In 2017, it was discovered that 40% of the Cuvette Centrale wetlands are underlain with a dense layer of peat, which contains around 30 petagrams (billions of tons) of carbon. This amounts to 28% of all tropical peat carbon, and it is also equivalent to carbon contained in all the forests of the Congo Basin. In other words, while this peatland only covers 4% of the Congo Basin area, its carbon content is equivalent to all the trees over the other 96%. Back then, it was also estimated that if all of that peat burned, the atmosphere would absorb the equivalent of 20 years of current United States carbon dioxide emissions, or three years of all anthropogenic  emissions. 

This threat prompted the signing of Brazzaville Declaration in March 2018: an agreement between Democratic Republic of Congo, the Republic of Congo and Indonesia (a country with longer experience of managing its own tropical peatlands) aiming to promote better management and conservation of this region. For comparison, 26% of its peat is located in the areas open to logging, mining or palm oil plantations, and nearly all of this area is open for fossil fuel exploration. 

Even in the absence of local disturbance from these activities, this area is the most vulnerable store of tropical peat carbon in the world, as its climate is already much drier than that of the other tropical peatlands in the Southeast Asia and the Amazon Rainforest. Moreover, additional 2022 research indicated that the geologically recent conditions between 7,500 years ago and 2,000 years ago were already dry enough to cause substantial peat release from this area, and suggested that we are likely to recreate these conditions in the near future under continued climate change. In this case, Cuvette Centrale would act as one of the tipping points in the climate system: for now, not enough research exists to describe when exactly it could be committed to tipping.

References

 Toham, Andre Kamdem et al., eds. (2006). A Vision for Biodiversity Conservation in Central Africa: Biological Priorities for Conservation in the Guinean-Congolian Forest and Freshwater Region. World Wildlife Fund, Washington DC. Page A-55.
 

Ecoregions of the Democratic Republic of the Congo
Freshwater ecoregions of Africa
Geography of the Democratic Republic of the Congo
Regions of Africa